Hartland Township may refer to:

 Hartland Township, McHenry County, Illinois
 Hartland Township, Worth County, Iowa
 Hartland Township, Kearny County, Kansas
 Hartland Township, Michigan
 Hartland Township, Freeborn County, Minnesota
 Hartland Township, Huron County, Ohio
 Hartland Township, Beadle County, South Dakota, in Beadle County, South Dakota
 Hartland Township, Kingsbury County, South Dakota, in Kingsbury County, South Dakota

Township name disambiguation pages